The 1964 Pittsburgh Steelers season was the team's 32nd in the National Football League.

The team played all of their home games at Pitt Stadium, and won five games, while losing nine, resulting in a fifth-place finish in the NFL Eastern Conference.  Following the season, the Steelers dismissed head coach Buddy Parker and replaced him with Mike Nixon.

Regular season

Schedule

Game summaries

Week 1 (Sunday September 13, 1964): Los Angeles Rams 

at Pitt Stadium, Pittsburgh, Pennsylvania

 Game time:
 Game weather:
 Game attendance: 33,988
 Referee:
 TV announcers:

Scoring drives:

 Los Angeles – FG Gossett 9 0–3
 Los Angeles – FG Gossett 39 0–6
 Los Angeles – Wilson 1 run (Gossett kick)0–13
 Pittsburgh – Ballman 25 pass from Brown (Clark kick)7–13
 Los Angeles – Allen 10 pass from Munson (kick failed)7–19
 Los Angeles – Lundy 14 interception return (Gossett kick)7–26
 Pittsburgh – King 4 run (Clark kick)14–26

Week 2 (Sunday September 20, 1964): New York Giants 

at Pitt Stadium, Pittsburgh, Pennsylvania

 Game time:
 Game weather:
 Game attendance: 33,053
 Referee:
 TV announcers:

Scoring drives:

 New York Giants – Barnes 26 interception (Chandler kick)0–7
 New York Giants – Webster 2 run (Chandler kick)0–14
 Pittsburgh – Hinton 8 interception return (kick failed)6–14
 Pittsburgh – Johnson 2 pass from Brown (Clark kick)13–14
 Pittsburgh – Brown 2 run (Chandler kick)20–14
 New York Giants – James 2 run (Chandler kick)20–21
 Pittsburgh – Brown 1 run (Clark kick)27–21
 New York Giants – FG Chandler 22 27–24

Week 3 (Sunday September 26, 1964): Dallas Cowboys 

at Pitt Stadium, Pittsburgh, Pennsylvania

 Game time:
 Game weather:
 Game attendance: 33,594
 Referee:
 TV announcers:

Scoring drives:

 Pittsburgh – FG Clark 3–0
 Dallas – FG Van Raaphorst 16 3–3
 Pittsburgh – Ballman 32 pass from Brown (kick failed)9–3
 Dallas – Clarke 7 pass from Meredith (Van Raaphorst kick)9–10
 Pittsburgh – Kelly 21 pass from Brown (Clark kick)16–10
 Pittsburgh – King 4 pass from Brown (Clark kick)23–10

Week 4 (Sunday October 4, 1964): Philadelphia Eagles 

at Franklin Field, Philadelphia

 Game time:
 Game weather:
 Game attendance: 59,394
 Referee: Bud Brubaker
 TV announcers:

Scoring drives:

 Philadelphia – T. Brown 23 pass from Snead (Baker kick)0–7
 Philadelphia – T. Brown 87 pass from Snead (Baker kick)0–14
 Philadelphia – Retzlaff 31 pass from Snead (Baker kick)0–21
 Pittsburgh – J. Bradshaw 33 run with recovered fumble (Clark kick)7–21

Week 5: at Cleveland Browns

Week 6 (Sunday October 18, 1964): Minnesota Vikings 

at Metropolitan Stadium, Bloomington, Minnesota

 Game time:
 Game weather:
 Game attendance: 39,873
 Referee:
 TV announcers:

Scoring Drives:

 Pittsburgh – FG Clark 12 3–0
 Minnesota – Brown 6 pass from Tarkenton (kick failed)6–3
 Pittsburgh – Hoak 17 pass from Brown (Clark kick)10–6
 Minnesota – Brown 59 pass from Tarkenton (Cox kick)10–13
 Minnesota – Brown 1 run (Cox kick)10–20
 Minnesota – FG Cox 25 10–23
 Minnesota – Hawkins 56 interception return (Cox kick)10–30

Week 7 (Sunday October 25, 1964): Philadelphia Eagles 

at Pitt Stadium, Pittsburgh, Pennsylvania

 Game time:
 Game weather:
 Game attendance: 38,393
 Referee: George Rennix
 TV announcers:

Scoring drives:

 Philadelphia – Concannon 15 run (Baker kick)0–7
 Pittsburgh – Peaks 70 run (Clark kick)7–7
 Philadelphia – Mack 53 pass from Snead (Baker kick)7–14
 Philadelphia – FG Baker 14 7–17
 Pittsburgh – FG Clark 13 10–17
 Philadelphia – FG Baker 47 10–20
 Philadelphia – Snead 1 run (Baker kick) 10–27
 Philadelphia – Cross 94 interception return (Baker kick)10–34

Week 8: vs. Cleveland Browns

Week 9 (Sunday November 8, 1964): St. Louis Cardinals 

at Busch Stadium, St. Louis, Missouri

 Game time:
 Game weather:
 Game attendance: 28,245
 Referee:
 TV announcers:

Scoring drives:

 St. Louis – FG Bakken 12 0–3
 Pittsburgh – FG Clark 19 3–3
 St. Louis – Gautt 2 run (Bakken kick)3–10
 Pittsburgh – FG Clark 43 6–10
 St. Louis – FG Bakken 16 6–13
 Pittsburgh – Ballman 28 pass from Brown13–13
 Pittsburgh – FG Clark 38 16–13
 St. Louis – Conrad 2 pass from Johnson (Bakken kick)16–20
 St. Louis – Gambrell 8 pass from Johnson (Bakken kick)16–27
 St. Louis – Meinert 18 interception return (Bakken kick)16–34
 Pittsburgh – Hoak 22 pass from Nelsen (Clark kick)23–34
 Pittsburgh – Ballman 29 pass from Nelsen (Clark kick)30–34

Week 10 (Sunday November 15, 1964): Washington Redskins 

at Pitt Stadium, Pittsburgh, Pennsylvania

 Game time:
 Game weather:
 Game attendance: 31,587
 Referee:
 TV announcers:

Scoring drives:

 Washington – Taylor 3 run (Martin kick)0–7
 Washington – Coia 80 pass from Jurgensen (kick failed)0–13
 Washington – Taylor 80 pass from Jurgensen (Martin kick)0–20
 Washington – Sample 15 interception (Martin kick)0–27
 Washington – FG Martin 31 0–30

Week 11 (Sunday November 22, 1964): New York Giants 

at Yankee Stadium, The Bronx, New York

 Game time:
 Game weather:
 Game attendance: 62,691
 Referee:
 TV announcers:

Scoring drives:

 Pittsburgh – FG Clark 10 3–0
 Pittsburgh – Thomas 13 pass from Brown (Clark kick)10–0
 Pittsburgh – Johnson 10 run (Clark kick)17–0
 New York Giants FG Chandler 22 yd FG17–3
 Pittsburgh – Ballman 22 pass from Brown (Clark kick)24–3
 Pittsburgh – FG Clark 28 27–3
 Pittsburgh – Johnson 2 run (Clark kick)34–3
 Pittsburgh – FG Clark 23 37–3
 New York Giants – Wood 8 run (Chandler kick)37–10
 Pittsburgh – Hoak 5 run (Clark kick)44–10
 New York Giants – Barnes recovered fumble in end zone (Chandler kick)44–17

Week 12 (Sunday November 29, 1964): St. Louis Cardinals 

at Pitt Stadium, Pittsburgh, Pennsylvania

 Game time:
 Game weather:
 Game attendance: 27,807
 Referee:
 TV announcers:

Scoring drives:

 St. Louis – Crow 5 run (Bakken kick)0–7
 Pittsburgh – FG Clark 30 3–7
 Pittsburgh – J. Bradshaw 47 fumble return (Clark kick)10–7
 Pittsburgh – Hoak 3 run (Clark kick) 17–7
 Pittsburgh – FG Clark 36 20–7
 St. Louis – Smith 42 pass from Johnson (Bakken kick)20–14
 St. Louis – Fischer 49 fumble return (Bakken kick)20–21

Week 13 (Sunday December 6, 1964): Washington Redskins 

at D.C. Stadium, Washington, D.C.

 Game time:
 Game weather:
 Game attendance: 42,219
 Referee:
 TV announcers:

Scoring drives:

 Pittsburgh – Johnson 4 run (Clark kick)7–0
 Washington – Taylor 36 run (Martin kick)7–7
 Pittsburgh – Ballman 47 pass from Brown (Clark kick)14–7

Week 14 (December 13, 1964): Dallas Cowboys 

at Cotton Bowl, Dallas, Texas

 Game time:
 Game weather:
 Game attendance: 35,271
 Referee:
 TV announcers:

Scoring drives:

 Dallas – FG Van Raaphorst 10 0–3
 Dallas – Norman 8 pass from Meredith (Van Raaphorst kick)0–10
 Pittsburgh – Hoak 3 pass from Brown (Clark kick)7–10
 Dallas – Dunn 3 run (Van Raaphorst kick)7–17
 Pittsburgh – Ballman 36 pass from Brown (Clark kick)14–17

Standings

Roster

References

External links 
 1964 Pittsburgh Steelers season at Profootballreference.com 
 1964 Pittsburgh Steelers season statistics at jt-sw.com 

Pittsburgh Steelers seasons
Pittsburgh Steelers
Pittsburgh Steel